The Goya Award for Best New Actor is one of the Goya Awards, Spain's principal national film awards.

The category was first presented at the ninth edition of the Goya Awards, with Saturnino García being the first winner for his performance in Justino, un asesino de la tercera edad.

In the list below the winner of the award for each year is shown first, followed by the other nominees.

Winners and nominees

1990s

2000s

2010s

2020s

References

External links
Official site
IMDb: Goya Awards

New Actor
Awards for young actors